Carrefour is a largely residential commune in the Port-au-Prince Arrondissement, in the Ouest department of Haiti. The commune had a population of 373,916 in 2003, according to the census of that year, and was officially estimated to have grown to 511,345 inhabitants in 2015. It is mostly a bedroom community for those who work in central Port-au-Prince.

Before the exile of Jean-Claude Duvalier, Carrefour was viewed as a Haitian tourist destination.

History
Carrefour was originally a military post in the borough of Port-au-Prince. In March 1795, Louis-Jacques Beauvais and André Rigaud defeated the English troops occupying the republican port.

The private residence of President Alexandre Petion in Carrefour has now become the home of the National School of Thor. This location holds important historical significance as it is tied to one of the founding fathers of Haiti.

On 1 May 1813, President Alexandre Pétion founded the village of Carrefour. Following a plan drawn up by surveyor Louis Rigaud, the village was to have 20 islets and 161 sites.

In 1869, the Cacos, in rebellion against the government of Sylvain Salnave, occupied Carrefour and attacked the fort of Bizoton without being able to settle there. While they were indulging in the delights of the region, Salnave lifted the Piquets of the South, who attacked them from behind and forced them to evacuate the military post. On 20 August 1889, at the height of the insurrection of the northerners against President Légitime, the vanguard of the Army of the South came to take up a position at Carrefour. The day after (21 August), the day before Légitime's departure, General Justin Carrie fought two battles and was defeated at Bizoton.

In one of his development projects, President François Denys Légitime planned to link Carrefour to Port-au-Prince by a line of steamboats along the coast to Leogane.

Carrefour was elevated to the rank of commune on 15 December 1982.

Geography
The commune of Carrefour is the crossroads through which thousands of cars, vans and trucks must pass in order to go to a part of the department of the west, the departments of the Southeast, the Nippes, the South and the Grande–Anse. Because of its geographical location and its natural environment, the urban and rural areas of the commune of Carrefour have economic and tourist potentialities.

The commune of Carrefour, commonly called "kafou" by its nationals, was originally a small village founded by the decree of President Petion on 1 May 1813. According to surveyor Louis Rigaud, this village comprised seven streets, 20 islets and 162 sites.

For more than a century and a half, Carrefour has never been urbanized as its founders wished. Its agricultural vocation took precedence over its urbanization. The original settlement provided the surrounding settlements (Monrepos, Lamentin, Mahotière, Thor, Brochette, Mariani) and the various communal sections supplied the villagers of Carrefour and the town of Port-au-Prince with agricultural products such as rice, cane sugar, cotton, fruit, vegetables, food, coffee, etc. It was not until the mid-1970s that the anarchic urbanization of the area began. This "urbanization" coincides with the liquidation of the main houses by the large landowners of Carrefour.

On 15 December 1982, 169 years after its founding, the village of Carrefour, which became the neighborhood of Carrefour, was elevated to the rank of commune on 15 December 1982. Carrefour, together with Port-au-Prince, Petion-Ville, Kenscoff, Gressier and Delmas, form the borough of Port-au-Prince. The rural area, which is fairly extensive, comprises the following 13 communal sections: Bizoton, Thor, Froide River, Corail Thor, Morne-à-Chandelle, Platon Dufresney, Taillefer, Procy, Bouvier, Coupeau, Laval, Berly and Malanga.

The topography of Carrefour is not quite different from that of Port-au-Prince. Like the latter, the municipality of Carrefour rises to the bottom of the Gulf of Gonave. It includes a mountainous part including the hills Malanga, Chandelle, Boyer, Froide River, Dufréné, Corail Thor.

Its geographical limits extend from the east to the north, from the junction of Fontamara 43 with the coastline until it meets Port-au-Prince Bay and extends along this coast until its meeting with the Mariani ravine. From the northwest, they turn south to the limit of the 12th Section of Morne-à-Bateau, the 23rd Section of the Parks and the 8th Section of Beau-Séjour de la as of Léogâne. From there, they re-join the boundaries of the 7th Section, Great River, 4th Section, Gosseline which belongs to the commune of Jacmel, and the 2nd Section, Nouvelle-Tourraine and the 20th Section, Bongars, of the commune of Kenscoff. They again rejoin Fontamara 43 by the South-South-East trajectory of the 8th Section, Martissant, of the commune of Port-au-Prince. The coordinates of the municipality are located on the one hand between 72°22' and 72°27' west longitude and on the other hand between 18°30' and 18°35' north latitude. Its area is estimated at 190 km².

As far as hydrography is concerned, the Froide River, one of the most important watercourses in the municipality, flows through Communal Sections of Plato Dufresney and continues to the Pond Section of the commune Of Petion-Ville. Then the river of Chauffard which irrigates the houses of the communal section Procy, that of Bengas at the level of Kenscoff and that of Momance or Grande-Rivière, between the communal sections of Procy and Laval. Among the less important rivers: the Grandin River, the Morel and Time-Perdu gullies.

On the demographic level, the commune of Carrefour has a population of more than 500,000 (five hundred thousand) inhabitants. However, it remains extremely difficult to have more or less reliable statistics on the population of Carrefour. According to the 1982 census, Carrefour had a population of 129,470 people; the 2003 census lists a population of 373,916 inhabitants. Based on 4.24%, the annual growth rate of its population, today, Carrefour would have a population of 460,251 inhabitants.

List of communal sections of Carrefour
The communal section (formerly section rurale) is the smallest administrative division in Haiti.
 

Morne Chandelle
Platon Dufréné
Taïfer
Procy 
Coupeau
Bouvier
Lavalle
Berly
Bizoton
Thor
Rivière Froide
Malanga
Corail Thor

Postal Code of Carrefour:

HT6130: Carrefour
HT6131: Bizoton
HT6132: Diquini, Thor
HT6133: Côte-Page, Mahotière
HT6134: Arcachon, Warney
HT6135: Brochette
HT6136: Lamentin, Mariani, Merger

Demographics

The commune of Carrefour is one of the largest municipalities in the Republic of Haiti if its size and population are taken into account. It comprises 13 communal sections. Its urban center is subdivided into zones or districts: part of Fontamara, Bizoton, Diquini, Thor, Mahotière, Côte-Plage, Waney, Arcachon, Monrepos, Brochette, Lamentin, Rivière Froide, part of Mariani. Some of these neighborhoods have more than 10000 inhabitants.

Most of the territory of the municipality of Carrefour is concentrated in its mountainous municipal sections. The lack of improved roads makes access by car or truck difficult; In most cases, the use of vehicles in these environments is completely impossible. With a population of more than 500,000 inhabitants, human pressure on the environment is growing.

When it comes to the relationship between urban and rural areas, Carrefour is no exception to the rule. Generally, in all municipalities of Haiti, the urban center commonly called "bouk or lavil" depends on their communal sections – most often located in the mountainous areas – for their food and drinking water supply. Despite this dependence, the communal sections are still treated as the country outside. When at the town hall, the only time a resident of a communal section will hear about the town hall is before the municipal elections. Although the so-called urban dwellers live on resources from rural areas, it has never occurred to them that these resources are inexhaustible. Their contempt for the rural environment and the concentration of services in the urban area have contributed to the abandonment of the countryside: the rural exodus.

It is the exploitation of quarries and extensive agriculture that pose a problem: they have an important social role because they employ thousands of people, but these activities cause the destruction of the environments. Operation accelerates water runoff, sediment accumulation and soil erosion. Farmers find themselves obliged to cultivate steeper land and make charcoal with the vegetation cover. The degradation of the environment is thus explained by a spatial inorganization. Some associations advocate more efficient development and campaign for clean-up or reconstruction.
Forest cover in Haiti is currently less than 3%. The depletion of water sources across the country is a direct result of deforestation. Until the second half of the 1980s, the Carrefour hills were largely covered with fruit and forest trees. As for the Froide River, its water was still crystalline. Thousands of people were still bathing there daily. In addition, every day, hundreds of women relied on this river to earn money after washing for customers who were always loyal to the appointment.

Economy
Unlike the majority of municipalities in the Republic of Haiti, agriculture occupies a very small place in Carrefour's economy. The commune of Carrefour occupies remains an appendix of Port-au-Prince. The secondary and tertiary sectors primarily supply its economic circuit. Nevertheless, agricultural activities are undertaken in the communal sections of Morne Chandelle, Plateau Dufresney, Taillefer, Procy, Coupeau, Laval, Bouvier and Malanga.

The inhabitants of all the communal sections of Carrefour depend mainly on agriculture; Coffee, vegetables, cereals, food and cane-sugar are grown there. There are also cattle (oxen, cabris, backyard birds on a very small scale), with the exception of coffee, an imported commodity grown on the hills of Rivière Froide, Dufresney and Corail Thor, The farmers of the communal sections of Carrefour only practice subsistence farming, in other words, their agricultural production does not have a significant impact on the economy of the commune, and the urban area where the majority Of the population, the economy works like the big Haitian cities, or even better.

On the other hand, in the urban center of Carrefour are concentrated on the one hand the main public services: the tribunal of peace, the Taxation Department, the police station, the registry office, the Coast Guard, The largest sports complex in the country. In addition, commercial activities: banks, supermarkets, bazaars, bakeries, public market, shops, pharmacies, etc. Industrial establishments such as paint factories, Haiti Metal, Mariani Tannery, Cuir SA, Adventist Packaging, SAFICO, ALTA and TOLI, STEP-OVER and oil companies (the National, Shell, Texaco, ESSO).

Two hospitals and numerous private clinics provide health care at the level of the commune of Carrefour: Diquini Adventist Hospital and Carrefour Hopital Maternité. Despite the presence of these hospitals, many Carrefourrois still continue to visit the hospitals and clinics located in the city of Port-au-Prince.

Education
A large number of public and private schools provide education at primary, secondary, vocational and university levels. In the last twenty years, due to the rural exodus to the center and the growing demand for education, primary and secondary schools have multiplied in Carrefour. Despite the presence of very good institutions in Carrefour, thousands of adolescents residing in the commune still continue to attend the schools located in Port-au-Prince.

List of Schools in Carrefour
Ensemble Scolaire Père Basile Moreau (ESPBM)
Juvénat du Sacré-Cœur
Lycée Louis Joseph Janvier 
Collège Univers Frère Raphaël
Collège de Côte-Plage
L'Ecole des Sœurs Salésiennes 
L'École Notre Dame de l'Assomption 
L'École Nationale de Thor
Collège Catherine Flon
Centre d'Études Secondaires
Centre Polyvalent
Collège Paul Etzer
L'École République du Centre Afrique
Le Lycée de Diquini
Collège de Radio Lumière
Collège Adventiste de Diquini
L'Université Adventiste

Tourism

In the 1970s and into the second half of the 1980s, Carrefour occupied a prominent position in tourism in Haiti. It was for Haitian and foreign tourists a favorite destination. However, after the collapse of the Duvalier regime and the ensuing instability, the tourist industry completely collapsed.

What is to be emphasized is the general idea of the urban areas of the commune of Carrefour. In the eyes of more than one, Carrefour represents above all a state of mind, a way of life. Its agglomerations and its many streets and alleys are characterized by great animation, exuberant joy, a deconcentrated and non-conformist way of living.

Until the end of the 80s, there was in the city of Carrefour a pleiade of night clubs commonly called "Boîte de Nui." These leisure centers (Hotel- Bars-Restaurant) were swarming in the urban center of Carrefour. The Spanish consonance of some of these centers testifies to the presence and influence of a large Dominican in the municipality. These include: Copa Cabana, El Baraquito, Rancho Cocktail, Corso Disco Club, Poco a Poco Bar, Mi Casa Hotel-Bar-Restaurant, Madruga Disco-Restaurant-Hotel, etc.

Other attractions in the area include Méridien Club, Paradis des Amis Restaurant-Hotel, Paladium Night Club, Downtown Disco Club, Mermaid Beach Hotel, Etoile de David Bar-Restaurant, Auberge du Québec, Chez Nounoune, Bamboulinos Hotel. But the most famous of these centers, either because of the luxury they offer or the musical groups that animated them, were the Lambi Night Club, the Domaine Ideal (whose clientele was mainly foreign), the Tiboukan Auberge Restaurant, the Three Fish and Chez Cator famous for its "pwason gwo sèl." Most of these establishments built on the seashore all enjoyed a very caressing breeze through the seasons.

On the other hand, the entertainment was enriched by the various cinemas: the Coliseum, Cric Crac Cine, Crystal Cine. There was also the cockfighting, especially at the Amical Gaguere de Mariani. As for the communal sections, the gargoyles hold the top of the bill.

Religion
Religious activities are multifaceted. It is a true syncretism Catholics, vodouisants, Adventists, Jehovah's Witnesses and adepts of various confessions compete with fervor. The churches dedicated to Saint Charles and Our Lady of Mount Carmel bring together an immense crowd of faithful from the surrounding districts and Port-au-Prince on the occasion of the patron festivals of 4 November and 16 July. As for the chapel of Saint Anthony, it is a permanent center of interest. Placed at the top of Merger, it never ceases to drain pilgrims. Other chapels exist in the communal sections.

The Protestant churches are found everywhere in the commune of Carrefour. Very often, late in the night, the quarters vibrate with their prayers and their songs of adoration. This establishes a very clear contrast with the dance music of night clubs or nightclubs. On the other hand, there are also the houmforts where the followers of the voodoo pay homage to the African gods, the loas. In this religious atmosphere, certain signs will never cease to astonish an observer: "God alone inspires us and science enlightens us: Botanica Sciencia de San Juan Templa." Macoumba.

What is particularly pleasing to point out are the social works undertaken by the different religious denominations. Outside the impressive schools, some have orphanages, canteens, places of retreat, and so on.

On 10 December 1905, the parish of Carrefour was erected by Mgr. Conan, two years after his elevation as Archbishop of Port-au-Prince. Carrefour was a small chapel in the parish of Sainte Anne, dedicated to Saint Charles of Borome. The first parish priest was R. P. Lebihain. Then, the Monfortains took possession of the Parish of Carrefour. A contract had been signed between the Archbishop of Port-au-Prince and the company of Mary (Monfortains) supported by Rome.

On 20 February 1910, Paul Marie Lebihain was appointed parish priest of Port-de-Paix and Vicar General of the Society of Mary, replaced by Father Brochard (1910–1947), RP Doriel (1947–1972) and Father Eustache Saint Hubert (1972–), etc.

The Monfortian monks built the presbytery, the church, a parish hall, chapels in the communal sections all by Fathers Dorel and Saint Hubert

The Parish of Carrefour has eight chapels scattered in the communal sections: Morne-a-Bateau, dedicated to Saint Antoine; Great River, Saint Paul; Morne-à-Chandelle, Saint Michel; Boucan Marie, Our Lady of the Annunciation; Bouvier, Holy Heart of Mary; Coupeau, Our Lady of Lourdes; Wiailles, Saint Francis Xavier; Côte-Plages, Our Lady of Perpetual Help.

In addition, under the administration of Father Dorélien, several religious communities settled in the Parish of Carrefour: the Brothers of the Sacred Heart, the Salesian Sisters, the Little Sisters of Saint Teresa, the Little Brothers of Saint Teresa, the Girls Of Wisdom and the Oblate Missionaries.

Government and Politics

Administration
Carrefour has a municipal council (conseil municipal) compound of three members elected by the inhabitants of the commune for a 4-year term. The municipal council is led by a president often called mayor.

Carrefour has a municipal assembly (assemblée municipale) who assists the council in its work.
The members of the assembly are also elected for 4 years.

Municipal Councils (2016–2020)
Jude Edouard Pierre (Mayor)
Maxo Bourdeau
Darlyne Joseph

Municipal Assembly (2016–2020)

2010 earthquake
On 12 January 2010, a magnitude 7.0 earthquake that hit Haiti caused heavy damage to residential buildings in Carrefour, with 40 to 50 per cent of buildings destroyed in the town's worst-affected areas. One of the damaged facilities was the city's hospital.

In the wake of the quake, the Cuban military set up a field hospital in the region. Electricity was restored to some sectors at the beginning of February.

As of 7 March 2010, a donated Fujifilm X-ray machine has arrived at the Adventists Medical Center.

References

External links
 City Hall of Carrefour, Website of the City Hall of Carrefour, Haiti
 Reuters, "Comprehensive Building Damage Assessment for Carrefour Commune, Haiti (Version 3)", 15 February 2010
 Reuters, "Intensity of Building Damages in Central Carrefour, Haiti", 25 February 2010

Port-au-Prince
Populated places in Ouest (department)
Communes of Haiti